Matthew Urwin (born 28 November 1993) is an English footballer who plays as a goalkeeper for Chorley.

Club career
Urwin made his professional debut for Bradford City in a 2-0 EFL Cup defeat to MK Dons in 2014. He replaced Mason Bennett after 65 minutes.

Career statistics

Notes

References

1993 births
Living people
English footballers
Association football goalkeepers
Blackburn Rovers F.C. players
Stalybridge Celtic F.C. players
Bradford City A.F.C. players
AFC Fylde players
Fleetwood Town F.C. players
Chorley F.C. players
National League (English football) players